Linganath Subbu (15 April 1931 – 16 September 2014) was an Indian cricketer. He played first-class cricket for Madhya Pradesh and Mysore between 1951 and 1960.

References

External links
 

1931 births
2014 deaths
Indian cricketers
Madhya Pradesh cricketers
Karnataka cricketers
Cricketers from Bangalore